The Disquieting Muses (in , 1916, 1917 or 1918) is a painting by the Italian metaphysical painter Giorgio de Chirico.

The Disquieting Muses was painted during World War I, when De Chirico was in Ferrara. The Castello Estense, near which de Chirico lived, is in the background, rust-red and among industrial buildings. At the front are the two Muses, dressed in classical clothing. One is standing and the other sitting, and they are placed among various objects, including a red mask and staff, an allusion to Melpomene and Thalia, the Muses of tragedy and comedy. The statue on a pedestal in the background is Apollo, leader of the Muses.

Giorgio Castelfranco, an art collector and critic, described the painting in 1948:

The artist Carlo Belli discussed the merits of the painting in a letter to the collector Feroldi in 1939:

This painting would later become an inspiration for Sylvia Plath's poem "The Disquieting Muses", which appeared in her 1960 collection The Colossus and Other Poems, and for the second poem in Mark Strand's "Two de Chiricos" from his Pulitzer Prize winning 1998 collection, Blizzard of One. 

A copy of this painting is located at the Italian Trade Commission (ITC) office, 33 East 67th Street, New York City.

References

Paintings by Giorgio de Chirico
1916 paintings
Greek Muses
Paintings of Apollo